ZDFdokukanal was a TV station between 1 April 2000 and 31 October 2009 and part of the digital TV package offered by ZDF.

Distribution
The program was broadcast nationwide via the TV cable networks (DVB-C) and the satellite Astra 19.2°E (DVB-S). In the regions where DVB-T was available, ZDFdokukanal could be also received via antenna between 9 pm and 6 am, alternating with KiKa. It was also included in the IPTV offer of some DSL providers.

Programming
The station provided background information on nature, science, history and society.

Since May 2009, the station has been transformed into a youth and family station in which the proportion of the documentaries has gradually been reduced and the number of entertainment programming has been increased. On 19 August 2009, ZDF announced that the station would cease broadcasting as of 31 October 2009. ZDFdokukanal was then replaced by ZDFneo.

Since the 2004 Summer Olympics in Athens, ARD and ZDF have been using their digital TV programs EinsExtra, EinsFestival, ZDFdokukanal and ZDFinfokanal to report additionally from the Olympic Games. This opportunity was also used at the 2008 European Football Championship to be able to broadcast matches simultaneously.

References

External links
 

German-language television stations
Defunct television channels in Germany
Television channels and stations established in 2000
Television channels and stations disestablished in 2009
2000 establishments in Germany
2009 disestablishments in Germany
Mass media in Mainz
ZDF